Morgenröthe-Rautenkranz is a village and a former municipality in the Vogtlandkreis district, in Saxony, Germany. Since 1 October 2009, along with Tannenbergsthal and Hammerbrücke, it is part of the municipality Muldenhammer.

Personalities
Sigmund Jähn (1937-2019), first German cosmonaut

Gallery

References

External links 

 
 
 

Former municipalities in Saxony
Vogtlandkreis